Sir Daniel Michael Blake Day-Lewis (born 29 April 1957) is an English retired actor. Often described as one of the preeminent actors of his generation, he received numerous accolades throughout his career which spanned over four decades, including three Academy Awards for Best Actor, making him the first and only actor to have three wins in that category, and the third male actor to win three competitive Academy Awards for acting, the sixth performer overall. Additionally, he has received four British Academy Film Awards, three Screen Actors Guild Awards and two Golden Globe Awards. In 2014, Day-Lewis received a knighthood for services to drama.

Born and raised in London, Day-Lewis excelled on stage at the National Youth Theatre before being accepted at the Bristol Old Vic Theatre School, which he attended for three years. Despite his traditional training at the Bristol Old Vic, he is considered a method actor, known for his constant devotion to and research of his roles. Displaying a "mercurial intensity", he would often remain completely in character throughout the shooting schedules of his films, even to the point of adversely affecting his health. He is one of the most selective actors in the film industry, having starred in only six films since 1998, with as many as five years between roles. Protective of his private life, he rarely grants interviews, and makes very few public appearances.

Day-Lewis shifted between theatre and film for most of the early 1980s, joining the Royal Shakespeare Company and playing Romeo Montague in Romeo and Juliet and Flute in A Midsummer Night's Dream. Playing the title role in Hamlet at the  National Theatre in London in 1989, he left the stage midway through a performance after breaking down during a scene where the ghost of Hamlet's father appears before him—this was his last appearance on the stage. In 1984, he appeared in The Bounty before gaining critical attention for his performances in Stephen Frears' My Beautiful Laundrette (1985) and James Ivory's A Room with a View (1986). He then assumed leading man status in Philip Kaufman's The Unbearable Lightness of Being (1988) and My Left Foot (1989), receiving his first Academy Award and British Academy Film Award for Best Actor for his performance in the latter film. He then starred in Michael Mann's historical war film The Last of the Mohicans (1992), Jim Sheridan's courtroom drama In the Name of the Father (1993) and Martin Scorsese's period romance The Age of Innocence (1993). 

Following his performance in The Boxer (1997), Day-Lewis retired from acting for three years, taking up a new profession as an apprentice shoe-maker in Italy. He returned to acting in 2000, reuniting with Scorsese in the historical crime film Gangs of New York (2002), winning a British Academy Film Award and receiving an Academy Award nomination. He won the Academy Award and British Academy Film Award for Best Actor for Paul Thomas Anderson's period drama There Will Be Blood (2007) and Steven Spielberg's biographical drama Lincoln (2012). After a decade, Day-Lewis reunited with Anderson for Phantom Thread (2017), for which he was also nominated for an Academy Award. He then announced his retirement following the completion of the film.

Early life and education 

Daniel Michael Blake Day-Lewis was born on 29 April 1957 in Kensington, London, the second child of poet Cecil Day-Lewis (1904–1972) and his second wife, actress Jill Balcon (1925–2009). His older sister, Tamasin Day-Lewis (born 1953), is a television chef and food critic. His father, who was born in the Irish town of Ballintubbert, County Laois, was of Protestant Anglo-Irish descent, lived in England from age two, and was appointed Poet Laureate in 1968. Day-Lewis's mother was Jewish; her Jewish ancestors were immigrants to England in the late 19th century, from Latvia and Poland. Day-Lewis's maternal grandfather, Sir Michael Balcon, became the head of Ealing Studios, helping develop the new British film industry. The BAFTA for Outstanding Contribution to British Cinema is presented every year in honour of Balcon's memory.

Two years after Day-Lewis's birth, he moved with his family to Crooms Hill in Greenwich via Port Clarence, County Durham. He and his older sister did not see much of their older two half-brothers, who had been teenagers when Day-Lewis's father divorced their mother. Living in Greenwich (he attended Invicta and Sherington Primary Schools), Day-Lewis had to deal with tough South London children. At this school, he was bullied for being both Jewish and "posh". He mastered the local accent and mannerisms, and credits that as being his first convincing performance. Later in life, he has been known to speak of himself as a disorderly character in his younger years, often in trouble for shoplifting and other petty crimes.

In 1968, Day-Lewis's parents, finding his behaviour to be too wild, sent him as a boarder to the independent Sevenoaks School in Kent. At the school, he was introduced to his three most prominent interests: woodworking, acting, and fishing. However, his disdain for the school grew, and after two years at Sevenoaks, he was transferred to another independent school, Bedales in Petersfield, Hampshire. His sister was already a student there, and it had a more relaxed and creative ethos. He made his film debut at age 14 in Sunday Bloody Sunday, in which he played a vandal in an uncredited role. He described the experience as "heaven" for getting paid £2 to vandalise expensive cars parked outside his local church.

For a few weeks in 1972, the Day-Lewis family lived at Lemmons, the north London home of Kingsley Amis and Elizabeth Jane Howard. Day-Lewis's father had pancreatic cancer, and Howard invited the family to Lemmons as a place they could use to rest and recuperate. His father died there in May that year. By the time he left Bedales in 1975, Day-Lewis's unruly attitude had diminished and he needed to make a career choice. Although he had excelled on stage at the National Youth Theatre in London, he applied for a five-year apprenticeship as a cabinet-maker. He was turned down due to lack of experience. He was accepted at the Bristol Old Vic Theatre School, which he attended for three years along with Miranda Richardson, eventually performing at the Bristol Old Vic itself. At one point he played understudy to Pete Postlethwaite, with whom he would later co-star in the film In the Name of the Father (1994).

John Hartoch, Day-Lewis's acting teacher at Bristol Old Vic, recalled:

Career

1980s
During the early 1980s, Day-Lewis worked in theatre and television, including Frost in May (where he played an impotent man-child) and How Many Miles to Babylon? (as a World War I officer torn between allegiances to Britain and Ireland) for the BBC. Eleven years after his film debut, Day-Lewis had a small part in the film Gandhi (1982) as Colin, a South African street thug who racially bullies the title character. In late 1982, he had his big theatre break when he took over the lead in Another Country, which had premiered in late 1981. Next, he took on a supporting role as the conflicted, but ultimately loyal, first mate in The Bounty (1984). He next joined the Royal Shakespeare Company, playing Romeo in Romeo and Juliet and Flute in A Midsummer Night's Dream.

In 1985, Day-Lewis gave his first critically acclaimed performance playing a young gay English man in an interracial relationship with a Pakistani youth in the film My Beautiful Laundrette. Directed by Stephen Frears, and written by Hanif Kureishi, the film is set in 1980s London during Margaret Thatcher's tenure as Prime Minister. It is the first of three Day-Lewis films to appear in the BFI's 100 greatest British films of the 20th century, ranking 50th.

Day-Lewis gained further public notice that year with A Room with a View (1985), based on the novel by E. M. Forster. Set in the Edwardian period of turn-of-the-20th-century England, he portrayed an entirely different character: Cecil Vyse, the proper upper-class fiancé of the main character. In 1987, Day-Lewis assumed leading man status by starring in Philip Kaufman's adaptation of Milan Kundera's The Unbearable Lightness of Being, in which he portrayed a Czech surgeon whose hyperactive sex life is thrown into disarray when he allows himself to become emotionally involved with a woman. During the eight-month shoot, he learned Czech, and first began to refuse to break character on or off the set for the entire shooting schedule. During this period, Day-Lewis was regarded as "one of Britain’s most exciting young actors". He and other young British actors of the time, such as Gary Oldman, Colin Firth, Tim Roth, and Bruce Payne, were dubbed the "Brit Pack".

Day-Lewis progressed his personal version of method acting in 1989 with his performance as Christy Brown in Jim Sheridan's My Left Foot. It won him numerous awards, including the Academy Award for Best Actor and BAFTA Award for Best Actor. Brown, known as a writer and painter, was born with cerebral palsy, and was able to control only his left foot. Day-Lewis prepared for the role by making frequent visits to Sandymount School Clinic in Dublin, where he formed friendships with several people with disabilities, some of whom had no speech. During filming, he again refused to break character. Playing a severely paralysed character on screen, off screen Day-Lewis had to be moved around the set in his wheelchair, and crew members would curse at having to lift him over camera and lighting wires, all so that he might gain insight into all aspects of Brown's life, including the embarrassments. Crew members were also required to spoon-feed him. It was rumoured that he had broken two ribs during filming from assuming a hunched-over position in his wheelchair for so many weeks, something he denied years later at the 2013 Santa Barbara International Film Festival.

Day-Lewis returned to the stage in 1989 to work with Richard Eyre, as the title character in Hamlet at the National Theatre, London, but during a performance collapsed during the scene where the ghost of Hamlet's father appears before him. He began sobbing uncontrollably, and refused to go back on stage; he was replaced by Jeremy Northam, who gave a triumphant performance. Ian Charleson formally replaced Day-Lewis for the rest of the run. Earlier in the run, Day-Lewis had talked of the "demons" in the role, and for weeks he threw himself passionately into the part. Although the incident was officially attributed to exhaustion, Day-Lewis claimed to have seen the ghost of his own father. He later explained that this was more of a metaphor than a hallucination. "To some extent I probably saw my father’s ghost every night, because of course if you’re working in a play like Hamlet, you explore everything through your own experience." He has not appeared on stage since. The media attention following his breakdown on-stage contributed to his decision to eventually move from England to Ireland in the mid-1990s, to regain a sense of privacy amidst his increasing fame.

1990s
Day-Lewis starred in the American film The Last of the Mohicans (1992), based on a novel by James Fenimore Cooper. Day-Lewis's character research for this film was well-publicised; he reportedly underwent rigorous weight training, and learned to live off the land and forest where his character lived, camping, hunting, and fishing. Day-Lewis also added to his wood-working skills, and learned how to make canoes. He carried a long rifle at all times during filming to remain in character.

He returned to work with Jim Sheridan on In the Name of the Father in which he played Gerry Conlon, one of the Guildford Four, who were wrongfully convicted of a bombing carried out by the Provisional IRA. He lost 2st 2 lb (30 lb or 14 kg) for the part, kept his Northern Irish accent on and off the set for the entire shooting schedule, and spent stretches of time in a prison cell. He insisted that crew members throw cold water at him and verbally abuse him. Starring opposite Emma Thompson (who played his lawyer Gareth Peirce), and Pete Postlethwaite, Day-Lewis earned his second Academy Award nomination, third BAFTA nomination, and second Golden Globe nomination.

Day-Lewis returned to the US in 1993, playing Newland Archer in Martin Scorsese's adaptation of the Edith Wharton novel The Age of Innocence. Day-Lewis starred opposite Michelle Pfeiffer, and Winona Ryder. To prepare for the film, set in America's Gilded Age, he wore 1870s-period aristocratic clothing around New York City for two months, including top hat, cane, and cape. Although Day-Lewis was sceptical of the role, deeming himself "too English" for it, he accepted due to Scorsese directing the film. The film was critically well received, while Peter Travers in Rolling Stone wrote: "Day-Lewis is smashing as the man caught between his emotions and the social ethic. Not since Olivier in Wuthering Heights has an actor matched piercing intelligence with such imposing good looks and physical grace."

In 1996, Day-Lewis starred in the film adaptation of Arthur Miller's play, The Crucible reunited with Winona Ryder, and starring alongside Paul Scofield, and Joan Allen. During the shoot, he met his future wife, Rebecca Miller, the author's daughter. Owen Gleiberman of Entertainment Weekly gave the film a grade of "A", calling the adaptation "joltingly powerful" and noting the "spectacularly" acted performances of Day-Lewis, Scofield, and Allen. He followed that with Jim Sheridan's The Boxer alongside Emily Watson, starring as a former boxer and IRA member recently released from prison. His preparation included training with former boxing world champion Barry McGuigan. Immersing himself into the boxing scene, he watched "Prince" Naseem Hamed train, and attended professional boxing matches such as the Nigel Benn vs. Gerald McClellan world title fight at London Arena. Impressed with his work in the ring, McGuigan felt Day-Lewis could have become a professional boxer, commenting, "If you eliminate the top ten middleweights in Britain, any of the other guys Daniel could have gone in and fought."

Following The Boxer, Day-Lewis took a leave of absence from acting by going into "semi-retirement" and returning to his old passion of wood-working. He moved to Florence, Italy, where he became intrigued by the craft of shoe-making. He apprenticed as a shoe-maker with Stefano Bemer. For a time, his exact whereabouts and actions were not made publicly known.

2000s

After a three-year absence from acting on screen, Day-Lewis returned to film by reuniting with Martin Scorsese for Gangs of New York (2002). He took on the role of villainous gang leader William "Bill the Butcher" Cutting, starring opposite Leonardo DiCaprio, who played Bill's young protégé as well as Cameron Diaz, Jim Broadbent, John C. Reilly, Brendan Gleeson, and Liam Neeson. To help him get into character, he hired circus performers to teach him to throw knives. While filming, he was never out of character between takes (including keeping his character's New York accent). At one point during filming, having been diagnosed with pneumonia, he refused to wear a warmer coat, or to take treatment, because it was not in keeping with the period; he was eventually persuaded to seek medical treatment. The film divided critics while Day-Lewis received plaudits for his portrayal of Bill the Butcher. Rotten Tomatoes's critical consensus reads, "Though flawed, the sprawling, messy Gangs of New York is redeemed by impressive production design and Day-Lewis's electrifying performance." It earned Day-Lewis his third Oscar nomination, and won him his second BAFTA Award for Best Actor in a Leading Role.

After Gangs of New York, Day-Lewis's wife, director Rebecca Miller, offered him the lead role in her film The Ballad of Jack and Rose, in which he played a dying man with regrets over how his life had evolved, and over how he had brought up his teenage daughter. While filming, he arranged to live separately from his wife to achieve the "isolation" needed to focus on his own character's reality. The film received mixed reviews.

In 2007, Day-Lewis starred alongside Paul Dano in Paul Thomas Anderson's loose film adaptation of Upton Sinclair's novel Oil!, titled There Will Be Blood. The film received widespread critical acclaim, with critic Andrew Sarris calling the film "an impressive achievement in its confident expertness in rendering the simulated realities of a bygone time and place, largely with an inspired use of regional amateur actors and extras with all the right moves and sounds." Day-Lewis received the Academy Award for Best Actor, BAFTA Award for Best Actor in a Leading Role, Golden Globe Award for Best Actor – Motion Picture Drama, Screen Actors Guild Award for Outstanding Performance by a Male Actor in a Leading Role (which he dedicated to Heath Ledger, who had died five days earlier, saying he was inspired by Ledger's acting and calling the actor's performance in Brokeback Mountain "unique, perfect"), and a variety of film critics' circle awards for the role. In winning the Best Actor Oscar, Day-Lewis joined Marlon Brando and Jack Nicholson as the only Best Actor winner awarded an Oscar in two non-consecutive decades.

In 2009, Day-Lewis starred in Rob Marshall's musical adaptation Nine as film director Guido Contini. The film featured a large ensemble of distinguished actresses, including Marion Cotillard, Penélope Cruz, Judi Dench, Nicole Kidman, and Sophia Loren. The film received mixed reviews, with overall praise for the performances of Day-Lewis, Cotillard, and Cruz. He was nominated for the Golden Globe Award for Best Actor – Motion Picture Musical or Comedy and the Satellite Award for Best Actor – Motion Picture Musical or Comedy for his role, as well as sharing nominations for the Screen Actors Guild Award for Outstanding Performance by a Cast in a Motion Picture and the Broadcast Film Critics Association Award for Best Cast and the Satellite Award for Best Cast – Motion Picture with the rest of the cast members.

2010s

Day-Lewis portrayed Abraham Lincoln in Steven Spielberg's biopic Lincoln (2012). Based on the book Team of Rivals: The Political Genius of Abraham Lincoln, the film began shooting in Richmond, Virginia, in October 2011. Day-Lewis spent a year in preparation for the role, a time he had requested from Spielberg. He read over 100 books on Lincoln, and long worked with the make-up artist to achieve a physical likeness to Lincoln. Speaking in Lincoln's voice throughout the entire shoot, Day-Lewis asked the British crew members who shared his native accent not to chat with him. Spielberg said of Day-Lewis's portrayal, "I never once looked the gift horse in the mouth. I never asked Daniel about his process. I didn't want to know." Lincoln received critical acclaim, especially for Day-Lewis's performance. It also became a commercial success, grossing over $275 million worldwide. In November 2012, he received the BAFTA Britannia Award for Excellence in Film. The same month, Day-Lewis featured on the cover of Time magazine as the "World's Greatest Actor".

At the 70th Golden Globe Awards, on 14 January 2013, Day-Lewis won his second Golden Globe Award for Best Actor, and at the 66th British Academy Film Awards on 10 February, he won his fourth BAFTA Award for Best Actor in a Leading Role. At the 85th Academy Awards, Day-Lewis became the first three-time recipient of the Best Actor Oscar for his role in Lincoln. John Hartoch, Day-Lewis's acting teacher at Bristol Old Vic theatre school, said of his former pupil's achievement:

Following his third Oscar win, there was much debate about Day-Lewis's standing among the greatest actors in film history. Joe Queenan of The Guardian remarked, "Arguing whether Daniel Day-Lewis is a greater actor than Laurence Olivier, or Richard Burton, or Marlon Brando, is like arguing whether Messi is more talented than Pelé, whether Napoleon Bonaparte edges out Alexander the Great as a military genius." When Day-Lewis himself was asked what it was like to be "the world's greatest actor", he replied, "It's daft isn't it? It changes all the time." Shortly after winning the Oscar for Lincoln, Day-Lewis announced he would be taking a break from acting, retreating back to his Georgian farmhouse in County Wicklow, Ireland, for the next five years, before making another film.

After a five-year hiatus, Day-Lewis returned to the screen to star in Paul Thomas Anderson's historical drama Phantom Thread (2017). Set in 1950s London, Day-Lewis played an obsessive dressmaker, Reynolds Woodcock, who falls in love with a waitress (played by Vicky Krieps). Prior to the film's release, on 20 June 2017, Day-Lewis's spokeswoman, Leslee Dart, announced that he was retiring from acting. Unable to give an exact reason for his decision, in a November 2017 interview, Day-Lewis stated: "I haven't figured it out. But it's settled on me, and it's just there ... I dread to use the over-used word 'artist', but there's something of the responsibility of the artist that hung over me. I need to believe in the value of what I'm doing. The work can seem vital, irresistible, even. And if an audience believes it, that should be good enough for me. But, lately, it isn't." On Day-Lewis's retirement, Anderson stated, "I would like to hope that he just needs a break. But I don't know. It sure doesn't seem like it right now, which is a big drag for all of us." The film and his performance were met with widespread acclaim from critics, and Day-Lewis was again nominated for the Academy Award for Best Actor.

Widely respected among his peers, in June 2017, Michael Simkins of The Guardian wrote, "In this glittering cesspit we call the acting profession, there are plenty of rival thesps who, through sheer luck or happenstance, seem to have the career we ourselves could have had if only the cards had fallen differently. But Day-Lewis is, by common consent, even in the most sourly disposed green rooms – a class apart. We shall not look upon his like again – at least for a bit. Performers of his mercurial intensity come along once in a generation." In 2020, The New York Times ranked him third on its list of the 25 Greatest Actors of the 21st century.

Personal life

Protective of his privacy, Day-Lewis has described his life as a "lifelong study in evasion". He had a relationship with French actress Isabelle Adjani that lasted six years, eventually ending after a split and reconciliation. Their son, Gabriel-Kane Day-Lewis, was born on 9 April 1995, in New York City, a few months after the relationship ended.

In 1996, while working on the film version of the stage play The Crucible, he visited the home of playwright Arthur Miller, where he was introduced to the writer's daughter, Rebecca Miller. They married later that year, on 13 November 1996. The couple have two sons, Ronan Cal Day-Lewis (born 1998) and Cashel Blake Day-Lewis (born 2002). They divide their time between their homes in Annamoe, Ireland, and Manhattan in New York City.

Day-Lewis has held dual British and Irish citizenship since 1993. He has maintained his Annamoe home since 1997. He stated: "I do have dual citizenship, but I think of England as my country. I miss London very much, but I couldn't live there because there came a time when I needed to be private and was forced to be public by the press. I couldn't deal with it." He is a supporter of South East London football club Millwall. Day-Lewis is also an Ambassador for The Lir Academy, a new drama school at Trinity College Dublin, founded in 2011.

On 15 July 2010, Day-Lewis received an honorary doctorate in letters from the University of Bristol, in part because of his attendance of the Bristol Old Vic Theatre School in his youth. Day-Lewis has stated that he had "no real religious education", and that he "suppose[s]" he is "a die-hard agnostic". In October 2012, he donated to the University of Oxford papers belonging to his father, the poet Cecil Day-Lewis, including early drafts of the poet's work and letters from actor John Gielgud and literary figures such as W. H. Auden, Robert Graves, and Philip Larkin. In July 2015, he became the Honorary President of the Poetry Archive. A registered UK charity, the Poetry Archive is a free website containing a growing collection of recordings of English-language poets reading their work. In June 2017, Day-Lewis became a patron of the Wilfred Owen Association. Day-Lewis's association with Wilfred Owen began with his father, Cecil Day-Lewis, who edited Owen's poetry in the 1960s and his mother, Jill Balcon, who was a vice-president of the Wilfred Owen Association until her death in 2009.

In 2008, when he received the Academy Award for Best Actor from Helen Mirren (who was on presenting duty having won the previous year's Best Actress Oscar for portraying Queen Elizabeth II in The Queen), Day-Lewis knelt before her, and she tapped him on each shoulder with the Oscar statuette, to which he quipped, "That's the closest I'll come to ever getting a knighthood." Day-Lewis was appointed a Knight Bachelor in the 2014 Birthday Honours for services to drama. On 14 November 2014, he was knighted by Prince William, Duke of Cambridge, in an investiture ceremony at Buckingham Palace.

Acting credits

Film

Television

Theatre

Music

Awards and nominations

See also
 List of people on the postage stamps of Ireland
 List of Academy Award records
List of British Academy Award nominees and winners
List of Irish Academy Award winners and nominees
List of oldest and youngest Academy Award winners and nominees – Youngest winners for Best Actor in a Leading Role
List of actors with Academy Award nominations 
List of actors with two or more Academy Award nominations in acting categories 
List of actors with two or more Academy Awards in acting categories
List of superlative Academy Award winners and nominees
List of Jewish Academy Award winners and nominees

Notes

References

External links
 
 
 

1957 births
Living people
Day-Lewis family
20th-century English male actors
21st-century English male actors
21st-century Irish male actors
Actors awarded knighthoods
Alumni of Bristol Old Vic Theatre School
Best Actor AACTA International Award winners
Best Actor Academy Award winners
Best Actor BAFTA Award winners
Best Drama Actor Golden Globe (film) winners
British expatriate male actors in the United States
Citizens of Ireland through descent
English agnostics
English expatriates in Italy
English expatriates in the United States
English male film actors
English male stage actors
English male television actors
English people of Irish descent
English people of Latvian-Jewish descent
English people of Polish-Jewish descent
Fellows of the American Academy of Arts and Sciences
Irish agnostics
Irish Jews
Irish male film actors
Irish male stage actors
Irish male television actors
Irish people of English descent
Irish people of Polish-Jewish descent
Jewish agnostics
Jewish English male actors
Knights Bachelor
Male actors from County Wicklow
Male actors from Kent
Male actors from London
Method actors
National Youth Theatre members
Outstanding Performance by a Male Actor in a Leading Role Screen Actors Guild Award winners
People educated at Bedales School
People educated at Sevenoaks School
People from Greenwich